Toshikazu Sano (October 11, 1940 – 2000) was a football referee from Japan. He is known for having officiated the 1984 Olympic tournament in Los Angeles, as well as qualification for the 1982, 1986, and 1990 World Cups, and the 1981 and 1987 FIFA World Youth Championships.

References

FIFA Profile

1940 births
2000 deaths
Japanese football referees
AFC Asian Cup referees